Gun laws in New Jersey regulate the sale, possession, and use of firearms and ammunition in the U.S. state of New Jersey.  New Jersey's firearms laws are among the most restrictive in the country.

Summary table

Constitutional provisions
The Constitution of New Jersey has no provision explicitly guaranteeing the right of citizens to keep and bear arms.

Limits and restrictions
Hollow-point ammunition is available for unrestricted purchase from most retailers wherever firearms are sold, and may be transported by purchasers without special licensing. However, hollow-point bullets may not be carried outside of a place of target practice, dwelling, premises or land possessed by a person, even if one has a valid permit to carry a handgun, except when being transported directly to and from these places. LEOSA (HR 218) qualified and retired or separated LEOs carrying anywhere in the US are exempt from state laws and may legally carry hollow-point ammunition or any ammunition that is not prohibited under the Gun Control Act of 1968 or the National Firearm Act. Additionally the NJ Superior Court in State v Brian Aitken has ruled that there is no exception for moving between residences with hollow-point bullets.

Some localities have adopted Second Amendment sanctuary resolutions.

Permits to purchase and own
In New Jersey, anyone seeking to purchase (but not to possess or use at exempt locations) firearms is required to obtain a lifetime Firearm Purchaser Identification card, commonly referred to as FPIC, for the purchase of rifles and shotguns. To purchase a handgun, a separate permit is needed from the Chief of Police of their municipality, or the Superintendent of State Police if the municipality does not have a local police department. A permit is required for each handgun to be purchased and expires after 90 days but may be extended for an additional 90 days at the discretion of the Chief of Police or Superintendent of State Police. These, like the initial Firearms Purchaser Identification Card (FPIC), are provided to applicants on a may-issue basis. They require in-depth application questioning, multiple references and background checks via the State Bureau of Identification and New Jersey State Police; however, authorities do not have discretion and must issue permits to applicants who satisfy the criteria described in the statutes. Reasons for denial include being convicted of a crime (equivalent to a felony) or disorderly persons offense (equivalent to a misdemeanor) in the case of domestic violence. As of August 2013 anyone on the terror watchlist is also disqualified. 

NJ law states that Firearms Purchaser Identification approval and/or handgun purchase permit(s) must be issued within 30 days. However, this is not always adhered to with some applicants waiting months to receive their permits. Applicants are able to appeal the denial of permits. The Firearm Purchaser ID card is also required to purchase handgun ammunition at dealers in the state. "Handgun ammunition" is interpreted as any caliber that can be used in a handgun, therefore some calibers that are typically used in rifles and shotguns require one to show a FPIC to purchase.

Private firearm transfers require a background check conducted through a federally licensed gun dealer.  The dealer is required to keep a record of the sale.  There are limited exceptions, including for transfers between members of an immediate family and for law enforcement officers.

Forms required by municipalities
:

Only two forms are required to obtain a FPIC or permit to purchase a handgun: the "Application for Firearms Purchaser Identification Card and/or Handgun Purchase Permit", STS-33, and "Consent For Mental Health Records Search", SP-66. Additionally, the Chief of Police for the Municipality or the Superintendent of State Police may require an applicant to be fingerprinted or complete a "Request for Criminal History Record Information", form SBI 212A.  Fingerprinting is usually done at private facilities such as Morpho (Safran) and the SBI 212A form can be submitted online or on paper. The method of submission is determined by the local police department. Many police departments and the NJSP are moving toward online submission and phasing out the paper SBI 212A.

Some municipalities have required additional forms, photographs and other requirements such as notarization. These forms are not required for approval per NJSA 2C:58-3a. This has been affirmed by the Appellate Court in  two cases, one against the City of Paterson by resident Jeremy Perez, and another against Jersey City by resident Michael McGovern where the court ruled against the cities in violation.

Fees
Each FPIC application fee is $5 and each permit to purchase a handgun is $2. Fingerprinting is charged a fee by the private facility contracted by the state, approximately $50 to $60. The SBI 212A "Request for Criminal History Record Information" application fee is $18 if submitted on paper or $20 if submitted online. Each police department has its own policy with regard to which method they choose for background checks. Some may require fingerprinting for each application, but most only require it for the initial FPIC.

New Jersey limits handgun purchases to one per 30-day period. Upon completing a New Jersey State police form, an FID card holder may be granted permission to purchase more than one handgun a month by declaring good reason. Reasons may include: recreational shooting; the purposes of collectors; when it is required for certain employment;  and when obtaining firearms as the beneficiary of a will.  The State application required for this increase, Form SP-015, specifically requires the make, model and serial number of each firearm to be transferred prior to the exemption, keeping the spirit of the purchasing limit safe from circumvention.

Self-made firearms 
New Jersey outlawed the manufacture and sale of self-made firearms/homemade firearms in 2018 and the transfer and possession in 2019 along with 3D printing guns, including possessing or sharing computer code that can be used to program the printing of such guns. The law is being challenged in court.

Permits to carry and transport

Permit to carry a handgun
New Jersey “shall-issue” a Permit to Carry a Handgun for both open and concealed carry to both residents and non-residents in accordance with New York State Rifle & Pistol Association, Inc. v. Bruen. One must submit an application to the chief law enforcement officer of one's municipality, or the Superintendent of State Police in areas where there is no local police department. Armored car employees are required to apply to the Superintendent of State Police. Non-residents may apply to the Superintendent of State Police. By judicial ruling, New Jersey is a "shall-issue" permit system, in which authorities must issue a permit if the applicant meets the minimum requirements. Additionally, training and range qualification is required. After a background check and review by the law enforcement agency, permit applications are forwarded to the Superior Court where they are approved or denied.

New Jersey formerly had a “justifiable need” standard by which an applicant was required to show a special, specific need, such as a substantiated threat, to be issued a permit. Supreme Court case New York State Rifle & Pistol Association, Inc. v. Bruen voided this requirement.

Qualified retired law enforcement officers may carry under LEOSA, which allows retired and current law enforcement officers who qualify and meet certain criteria to carry concealed firearms. There is no requirement for qualified retired or separated officers to apply for the state permit when carrying under LEOSA, 18 U.S. Code § 926C, since the federal law trumps state law through the Supremacy Clause.  As of the end of 2013, there were 1,212 active Handgun Carry Permits in New Jersey, out of a population of nearly 9 million residents.

New Jersey A4769 places a proactive requirement on the side of business owners that wish to allow carry of a firearm on their premises, effectively making the default such that all private property would be illegal for New Jersey gun owners to carry firearms on. This is also being challenged in court on the basis that, "Even business owners who are happy to serve permit holders carrying concealed handguns may be reluctant to advertise that fact, lest they alienate other customers with strong anti-gun views."

Carry to exempted locations
There are a few exempted locations where one may carry and possess firearms. These locations are one's home, place of business, premises or land possessed, or to a gunsmith for purposes of repair. Members of rifle or pistol clubs that submit their names to the state police annually are allowed to possess and transport their firearms to "a place of target practice."  Those who are not members of a rifle or pistol club can carry their firearms to  "an authorized target range." One may also carry firearms to the woods or fields or waters of the state for purposes of hunting or fishing. One must have a valid hunting or fishing license and the firearms must be appropriate for hunting or fishing to be covered under this exemption.

Interstate transportation of unloaded firearms
Interstate transportation is covered under the Safe Passage provision of the Firearm Owners Protection Act (FOPA), 18 USC § 926A, which states:

However, the Third Circuit Court of Appeals in Association of New Jersey Rifle and Pistol Clubs v. Port Authority of New York and New Jersey has found that this provision only applies to transporting a firearm in a vehicle, and that carrying a firearm in a locked container in checked luggage in an airport terminal to declare it to the airline constitutes unlawful possession and is not protected under the law. This decision was a direct result of a 2005 incident where Gregg C. Revell, a Utah Resident with a valid Utah Concealed Firearm Permit was traveling through Newark Airport en route to Allentown, Pennsylvania. Because of a missed flight, he was given his luggage, which included a properly checked firearm, and was forced to spend the night in a hotel in New Jersey. When he returned to the airport the following day to check his handgun for the last portion of the trip, he was arrested for illegal possession of a firearm. Revell lost his lawsuit after The U.S. Court of Appeals for the Third Circuit held in Gregg C. Revell v. Port Authority of New York and New Jersey, [222] held that "Section 926A does not apply to Revell because his firearm and ammunition were readily accessible to him during his stay in New Jersey." This opinion will apply to NJ airports. If a traveler misses a flight or for any other reason their flight is interrupted and the airline tries to return their luggage that includes a checked firearm, the traveler cannot take possession of the firearm if they are taking a later flight. The Association of New Jersey Rifle and Pistol Clubs (ANJRPC) later also sued the Port Authority of New York and New Jersey, which resulted in a similar decision.

Assault firearms and magazine capacity

Firearms classed as "assault firearms" but acquired before May 1, 1990, and registered with the state are legal to possess. Police officers may possess assault weapons for duty purposes and may possess personal assault weapons with recommendation by their agency. FFLs are also allowed to possess "assault firearms."

Assault firearm feature criteria

Under New Jersey law, a firearm is classified as an "assault firearm" if it meets the following criteria:

Semi-automatic rifles able to accept detachable magazines and at least two of the following:
Folding or telescoping stock
A pistol grip that protrudes conspicuously beneath the action of the weapon
Bayonet mount
Flash suppressor, or threaded barrel designed to accommodate a flash suppressor 
Grenade launcher mount

Semi-automatic pistols with detachable magazines and at least two of the following:
Magazine that attaches outside the pistol grip
Threaded barrel to attach barrel extender, flash suppressor, forward handgrip, or silencer
Barrel shroud safety feature that prevents burns to the operator (does not include the slide of a pistol)
Unloaded weight of 50 oz (1.4 kg) or more
A semi-automatic version of a fully automatic firearm.

semi-automatic shotguns that has at least 2 of the following:
A folding or telescoping stock;
A pistol grip that protrudes conspicuously beneath the action of the weapon;
A fixed magazine capacity in excess of 5 rounds; and
An ability to accept a detachable magazine.

A semiautomatic rifle with a fixed magazine capacity exceeding 10 rounds. 

A firearm that meets the above criteria is considered to be “assault firearm” and may only be possessed by a licensed firearms dealer, active duty law enforcement officers and active duty military personnel.

 “Assault firearm” shall not include a semi-automatic rifle which has an attached tubular device and which is capable of operating only with .22 caliber rimfire ammunition.

Banned manufacturers, models, and types

The following manufacturers, models, and types are banned:

Armalite AR-180 type 
Australian Automatic Arms SAR 
Avtomat Kalashnikov type semi-automatic firearms 
Beretta AR-70 and BM59 semi-automatic firearms 
Bushmaster Assault Rifle 
Calico M-900 Assault carbine and M-900 
CETME G3 
Chartered Industries of Singapore SR-88 type 
Colt AR-15 and CAR-15 series (Colt Match Target Rifle are allowed)
Daewoo K-1, K-2, Max 1 and Max 2, AR 100 types 
Demro TAC-1 carbine type 
Encom MP-9 and MP-45 carbine types 
FAMAS MAS223 types 
FN-FAL, FN-LAR, or FN-FNC type semi-automatic firearms 
Franchi SPAS 12 and LAW 12 shotguns 
Galil type 
Heckler and Koch HK91, HK93, HK94, MP5, PSG-1 
Intratec TEC 9 and 22 semi-automatic firearms 
M1 carbine type 
M14S type (M1A's are allowed)
MAC 10, MAC 11, MAC 11-9mm carbine type firearms 
PJK M-68 carbine type 
Plainfield Machine Company Carbine 
Ruger K-Mini-14/5F and Mini-14/5RF (Folding & Telescopic Models) 
SIG AMT, SIG 5050SP, SIG 551SP, SIG PE-57 types 
SKS with detachable magazine type 
Spectre Auto carbine type 
Springfield Armory BM59 and SAR-48 type 
Sterling MK-6, MK-7, and SAR types 
Steyr A.U.G. semi-automatic firearms 
USAS 12 semi-automatic type shotgun 
Uzi type semi-automatic firearms 
Valmet M62, M71S, M76, or M78 type semi-automatic firearms 
Weaver Arm Nighthawk

Magazine capacity
In New Jersey, it is illegal to possess any magazine that is capable of accepting more than 10 rounds of ammunition for semi-automatic weapons. Sales to law enforcement agencies or to federally licensed firearm dealers are exempt.

This definition shall not include a semi-automatic rifle which has an attached tubular device and which is capable of operating only with .22 caliber rimfire ammunition.

Bump stock
In his final day in office in January 2018, Governor of New Jersey Chris Christie signed legislation making the gun accessory known as a bump stock illegal.

New Jersey Childproof Handgun Law

The New Jersey Childproof Handgun Law is a 2002 state law that requires that all Dealers offer at least One smart gun for sale in their store.

Red flag law
Under New Jersey's red flag law, a judge may issue a gun violence restraining order authorizing the police to confiscate a person's firearms if the judge determines that the person poses a significant risk of personal injury to himself or others.  A hearing must be held within ten days.  At the hearing the person's firearms may be forcibly confiscated for a period of up to one year.

See also
 Law of New Jersey
 New Jersey Childproof Handgun Law

References

New Jersey law
New Jersey